Edward Bamucwanira (b. 1952) was an Anglican bishop in Uganda: he was Bishop of East Rwenzori from 2009 to 2018.

References

Uganda Christian University alumni
Anglican bishops of East Rwenzori
21st-century Anglican bishops in Uganda
Living people
1952 births